The 2003 Ford Racing Australian Formula Ford Championship was an Australian motor racing competition for Formula Ford racing cars. It was managed by the Formula Ford Association Inc. and was recognised by the Confederation of Australian Motor Sport as a National Championship. The title, which was the eleventh Australian Formula Ford Championship, was won by  Neil McFadyen driving a Van Diemen RF94.

Race calendar
The championship was contested over eight rounds with two races per round. 

Round placings were based on the addition of championship points awarded in both races.

Points system
Championship points were awarded on a 20-15-12-10-8-6-4-3-2-1 basis to the first ten finishers in each race.

An additional point was awarded to the driver gaining pole position for the first race at each round.

Results

Avon Rookie of the Year
 The Avon Rookie of the Year title was awarded to Bryce Washington.

Notes 
 Race 2 of Round 1 at Phillip Island was cancelled after rain left the circuit in an unsafe condition.
 Under Australian Formula Ford regulations, all cars were required to use a Ford 1600cc crossflow engine.

References

External links

Australian Formula Ford Championship seasons
Formula Ford